Tommy S. Lazarus (born 15 October 1962) is a Zimbabwean former long-distance runner. He competed in the marathon at the 1984 Summer Olympics.

References

External links
 

1962 births
Living people
Athletes (track and field) at the 1984 Summer Olympics
Zimbabwean male long-distance runners
Zimbabwean male marathon runners
Olympic athletes of Zimbabwe
Place of birth missing (living people)